The Truth is the sixth and final studio album released by New Orleans rap group, TRU. It was released on February 22, 2005, on The New No Limit  and was produced by Master P, Drumma Boy, Kaos, Myke Diesel and Bass Heavy. Compared to the previous two TRU albums, The Truth only found minor success selling 45,000 copies, peaking at No. 54 on the Billboard 200, No. 15 on the Top R&B/Hip-Hop Albums and No. 2 on the Independent Albums. A Chopped and screwed version of the album mixed by Michael 5000 Watts was released on April 26, 2005. By December 2005 the album sold about 200,000 copies.

C-Murder
Due to the incarceration of C-Murder, newcomer Halleluyah took his place in the album's recording process. TRU Member C-Murder makes an appearance only on one song due to his incarceration at the time.

Track listing

References

2005 albums
TRU (group) albums
No Limit Records albums
Priority Records albums
Albums produced by Drumma Boy